Belita Jepson-Turner (21 October 1923 – 18 December 2005), known professionally as Belita, was a British Olympic figure skater, dancer and film actress.

Biography
Born at Nether Wallop, Hampshire, to Major William Jepson-Turner and wife Gladys Olive Lyne-Stivens. She skated (as Belita Jepson-Turner) for the United Kingdom in the 1936 Winter Olympics, where she was placed 16th in the singles, then her career turned towards Hollywood. She had classical Russian ballet training which carried over into her skating.  As a young ballerina, she was partner to Anton Dolin, appearing with the Dolin-Markova Ballet. 

She appeared in films, making several highly profitable productions for Monogram Pictures, including skating in Silver Skates (1943) and Lady, Let's Dance (1944), skating and playing the dramatic lead in and the film noir Suspense (1946), and the female lead in The Gangster (1947).  For a brief period, she was Monogram's highest-paid star. Later she worked with A-list stars Charles Laughton in The Man on the Eiffel Tower (1949, and Clark Gable in Never Let Me Go (1953). In 1957 she danced with Fred Astaire in Silk Stockings. 

Belita accepted an invitation from skating coach Rupert Whitehead to perform in a club carnival in Winnipeg, Manitoba in 1948. 

In 1956, she retired from skating, and three years later gave up show business altogether. She appeared briefly on the ice at Madison Square Garden in New York City in 1981 in a short production based on "Solitude" by Duke Ellington.

Personal life
	
In 1946, Belita married Joel McGinnis; they divorced in 1956. She remarried, to Irish actor James Berwick (né James Kenny; 1929–2000), in 1967; they remained married until his death. Both marriages were childless.

Belita retired to live in Montpeyroux, Hérault, France, where she died in 2005, aged 82.

Filmography

References

Notes

External links

 
 

1923 births
2005 deaths
British expatriate actresses in the United States
British expatriates in France
British female single skaters
English film actresses
Figure skaters at the 1936 Winter Olympics
Olympic figure skaters of Great Britain
People from Test Valley